The Coroner is a BBC Birmingham  drama series starring Claire Goose as Jane Kennedy, a coroner based in a fictional South Devon coastal town. Matt Bardock stars as Detective Sergeant Davey Higgins.

On 2 March 2017, the BBC announced that the series had been cancelled after two series.

Synopsis
Jane Kennedy returns to Lighthaven as the local coroner. She works with Davey Higgins, a Detective Sergeant in the South Dart police; they were childhood sweethearts until he broke her heart. They investigate any sudden, violent or unexplained deaths in the South Hams district of South Devon. Also featuring are Beth, Kennedy's 15-year-old daughter; Judith, Kennedy's mother; Judith's boyfriend, Mick Sturrock; and Clint Holman, Coroner's Officer.

Cast
 Claire Goose as Jane Kennedy, Coroner
 Matt Bardock as Davey Higgins, Detective Sergeant
 Beatie Edney as Judith Kennedy, Jane's mother
 Ivan Kaye as Mick Sturrock, landlord of The Black Dog
 Oliver Gomm as Clint Holman, Coroner’s Officer
 Grace Hogg-Robinson as Beth Kennedy, Jane's daughter

Production
Sally Abbott created The Coroner from an idea by Will Trotter, executive producer and head of BBC Drama Birmingham, about a woman coroner aged about 40 and in a location such as the Cotswolds or Devon. The series would have self-contained stories with drama and humour; a formula successfully used in Father Brown from the same production team. The characters, Jane and Davey, were based on Katharine Hepburn and Spencer Tracy in Adam's Rib with the unresolved sexual tension between them. Abbott wrote the Davey character with Matt Bardock in mind. She created four other characters to complete the cast.

According to the BBC, the series is not based on, or inspired by, M R Hall's best-selling books including The Coroner. Hall stated he was "unhappy" about the "enormous similarities", but the BBC say any resemblance with his booksalso about an unusually pro-active, Land Rover driving, forty-something female solicitor who after a failed relationship returns to the West Country to take up the post of coronerare purely coincidental.

The production office was located at Dartington where some interior scenes were filmed. Filming began in mid-April 2015 for 15 weeks. The episodes were divided into blocks of two with the same director, assistant director, and director of photography.

Locations included Hope Cove, Dartmouth, Torquay, and Broadsands Beach, Paignton. The Mansion, now a community building, in Totnes was used as the Coroner's Court. A brass plate was attached to the brickwork. The exterior and interior of Oldway Mansion is used as Lighthaven's town hall. The Old Customs House in Bayard's Cove, Dartmouth is the location of the Coroners office.

The set for The Black Dog Inn is the derelict Crooked Spaniards Inn, Cargreen, Cornwall. The tower at Gribben Head, Cornwall featured in the first episode.

Episodes

Series 1 (2015)

Series 2 (2016)

DVD
Both series are available on DVD in the UK. They have also been released in Germany and Australia. All of these releases are PAL format. NTSC format DVDs will be released in the USA in 2018. Although being one of the first BBC drama series to be shot in 4K resolution, there have been no blu-rays released in either 4K or high definition in any region to date.

References

External links

 
 

2015 British television series debuts
2016 British television series endings
2010s British crime drama television series
2010s British legal television series
BBC crime television shows
BBC high definition shows
BBC television dramas
Detective television series
English-language television shows
Television shows about death
Television shows set in Devon
BBC Daytime television series